Venus Williams defeated the defending champion Lindsay Davenport in the final, 6–3, 7–6(7–3) to win the ladies' singles tennis title at the 2000 Wimbledon Championships. It was her first major singles title. Williams lost only one set during the entire tournament, to Martina Hingis in the quarterfinals.

Seeds

  Martina Hingis (quarterfinals)
  Lindsay Davenport (final)
  Mary Pierce (second round)
  Conchita Martínez (second round)
  Venus Williams (champion)
  Monica Seles (quarterfinals)
  Nathalie Tauziat (first round)
  Serena Williams (semifinals)

  Arantxa Sánchez Vicario (fourth round)
  Sandrine Testud (first round)
  Anke Huber (fourth round)
  Amanda Coetzer (second round)
  Amélie Mauresmo (first round)
  Julie Halard-Decugis (first round)
  Barbara Schett (first round)
  Dominique Van Roost (first round)

Qualifying

Draw

Finals

Top half

Section 1

Section 2

Section 3

Section 4

Bottom half

Section 5

Section 6

Section 7

Section 8

References

External links

2000 Wimbledon Championships on WTAtennis.com
2000 Wimbledon Championships – Women's draws and results at the International Tennis Federation

Women's Singles
Wimbledon Championship by year – Women's singles
Wimbledon Championships
Wimbledon Championships